Safe Harbour is a four-part Australian thriller drama series first broadcast on SBS on 7 March 2018. The series follows a group of friends who travel from Brisbane on a sailing holiday of a lifetime to Indonesia, who cross paths with a fishing boat overloaded with asylum seekers en route to Australia, which alters their lives forever.

Production
It is made by Matchbox Pictures, directed by Glendyn Ivin and written by Belinda Chayko, Matt Cameron and Phil Enchelmaier, and based on an original idea of Enchelmaier and Simon Kennedy. The series was produced Stephen Corvini, with Sue Masters as executive producer.

Release
The series was first broadcast in Australia on SBS on 7 March 2018.

Outside Australia, the series was made available for streaming on Hulu in the United States, and was broadcast on BBC Four in the United Kingdom from 2 February 2019. The series was released on Region 4 DVD on 18 April 2018. It aired on television in Ireland on RTÉ2 from July 2019.

Reception
Luke Buckmaster of Guardian Australia described the series as "deeply compelling". Mama Mia's entertainment editor Laura Brodnik praised the series, claiming that it left viewers asking one nagging question: "What would you do?".

Wenlei Ma of news.com.au described the series as "unmissable", writing; "When Australian TV is seemingly filled, wall-to-wall, with one same-same reality franchise after another, it can be hard to find quality Australian stories that offer you something new. This is one, and you best not miss it."

Awards
The show won an International Emmy in 2019 for Best TV Movie or Miniseries

Cast
 Ewen Leslie as Ryan Gallagher
 Leeanna Walsman as Bree Gallagher
 Joel Jackson as Damien Pascoe
 Jacqueline McKenzie as Helen Korczak
 Phoebe Tonkin as Olivia Gallagher
 Hazem Shammas as Ismail Al-Biyati
 Nicole Chamoun as Zahra Al-Biyati
 Robert Rabiah as Bilal Al-Biyati
 Yazeed Daher as Asad Al-Bayati
 Maha Riad as Yasmeen Al-Bayati 
 Ella Macrokanis as Maddie Gallagher
 Callum Aston as Lachlan Gallagher
 Pacharo Mzembe as Matou 
 Pip Miller as Graham Newland 
 Susan Prior as Renee 
 Damien Garvey as AFP Officer Wade
 Andrea Moor as AFP Officer Matera

Episodes

References

External links
 

2018 Australian television series debuts
Australian drama television series
English-language television shows
Special Broadcasting Service original programming
Television series by Matchbox Pictures
International Emmy Award for Best TV Movie or Miniseries